The 86th Airlift Squadron is an inactive United States Air Force unit. Its last assignment was to the 60th Air Mobility Wing at Travis Air Force Base, California, where it was inactivated on 1 November 1993.

History

World War II
The group was first activated in the spring of 1943 as the 86th Transport Squadron, one of the original squadrons of the 27th Air Transport Group' at RAF Hendon, England to provide air transportation for Eighth Air Force.  The 27th group was activated to give a formal organization to several airlift operations that were already serving VIII Air Force Service Command.  One of these, located at was a passenger and freight operation at RAF Hendon.  The Hendon operation became the 86th Transport Squadron. In the fall of 1944, the group and its squadrons moved to Le Bourget Airport, near Paris, where the 86th continued its operations through V-E Day.

I July 1945, the squadron returned to the United States, where it served as a transport squadron for I Troop Carrier Command until it was inactivated in November 1945.

Cold War

The squadron was reconstituted in June 1952 as the 86th Air Transport Squadron and activated as part of Military Air Transport Service (MATS)'  1602d Air Transport Wing in West Germany in July. It provided air transport between USAF bases in Europe until 1954, when it moved to Charleston Air Force Base, South Carolina in 1955, where it provided airlift until it was inactivated in 1955.

The squadron was reactivated in January 1963 as a Lockheed C-130 Hercules squadron at Travis Air Force Base, California. The squadron received its first C-130E in April. It flew long distance flights from Travis to Hawaii, Guam, Vietnam, Thailand, Japan and the Philippines. It upgraded to Lockheed C-141 Starlifter jet transports in 1967 and usually flew cargo and personnel to and from Travis to aerial ports in South Vietnam during the Vietnam War.

After the US withdrawal from Indochina in 1975, it flew C-141s on a worldwide basis.  In late 1991 the unit was redesignated the 86th Airlift Squadron.  The 86th was inactivated in 1993 and its mission, personnel and equipment were transferred to the 20th Airlift Squadron.

Lineage
 Constituted as the 86th Transport Squadron (Cargo & Mail)
 Activated on 15 April 1943
 Disbanded on 15 November 1945
 Reconstituted as the 86th Air Transport Squadron, Medium on 20 June 1952
 Activated on 20 July 1952
 Redesignated 86th Air Transport Squadron, Medium (Augmented) on 1 December 1952
 Redesignated 86th Air Transport Squadron, Medium on 1 May 1954
 Inactivated on 1 July 1955
 Redesignated the 86th Air Transport Squadron, Heavy and activated on 21 December 1962 (not organized)
 Organized on 8 January 1963
 Redesignated the 86th Military Airlift Squadron on 8 January 1966
 Redesignated the 86th Airlift Squadron on 1 November 1991
 Inactivated on 1 November 1993

Assignments
 27th Air Transport Group, 15 April 1943
 I Troop Carrier Command, August 1945
 IX Troop Carrier Command, 4 – 15 November 1945
 1602d Air Transport Wing, 20 July 1952
 1608th Air Transport Group, 20 May 1954 − 1 July 1955
 1501st Air Transport Wing, 8 January 1963
 60th Military Airlift Wing, 8 January 1966
 60th Military Airlift Group, 6 March 1978
 60th Military Airlift Wing, 15 February 1979
 60th Operations Group, 1 October 1992 – 1 November 1993

Stations

 RAF Hendon, England, 15 April 1943
 RAF Heston, England, January 1944
 Le Bourget Airport, France, October 1944
 Villacoublay Airfield, France, March 1945
 Le Havre-Octeville Airport, July 1945 – July 1945
 New York Port of Embarkation, New York, August 1945
 Baer Field, Indiana, 13 August 1945 – 15 November 1945
 Rhein-Main Air Base, West Germany, 20 July 1952
 Charleston Air Force Base, South Carolina, 20 May 1954 − 1 July 1955
 Travis Air Force Base, California, 8 January 1963 – 1 November 1993

Aircraft

 Douglas C-47 Skytrain, 1943–1945
 Douglas C-54 Skymaster, 1952–1955
 Lockheed C-130 Hercules, 1963–1966
 Lockheed C-141 Starlifter, 1967–1993

Awards and campaigns

See also

References

Notes

Bibliography

 
 
 
 
 AF Pamphlet 900-2, Unit Decorations, Awards and Campaign Participation Credits, Vol II Department of the Air Force, Washington, DC, 30 September 1976

086